The 2021–22 New Hampshire Wildcats men's basketball team represented the University of New Hampshire in the 2021–22 NCAA Division I men's basketball season. They played their home games at the Lundholm Gym in Durham, New Hampshire and were led by 17th-year head coach Bill Herrion. They finished the season 15-13, 10-8 in America East Play to finish a tie for 2nd place. They lost in the quarterfinals of the America East tournament to Binghamton.

Previous season
In a season limited due to the ongoing COVID-19 pandemic, the Wildcats finished the 2019–20 season 10-9, 9-6 in America East play to finish in third place. They lost in the quarterfinals of the America East tournament to UMass Lowell.

Roster

Schedule and results

|-
!colspan=12 style=| Non-conference regular season

|-
!colspan=12 style=| America East regular season

 
|-
!colspan=12 style=|America East tournament

|-

Source

References

New Hampshire Wildcats men's basketball seasons
New Hampshire Wildcats
New Hampshire Wildcats men's basketball
New Hampshire Wildcats men's basketball